Nguyễn Ngọc Anh (born 10 August 1988) is a Vietnamese footballer who plays as a forward for V.League 3 club Đồng Nai

References 

1988 births
Living people
Vietnamese footballers
Association football forwards
Song Lam Nghe An FC players
Xuan Thanh Saigon Cement FC players
Dong Nai FC players
V.League 1 players
People from Nghệ An province
Southeast Asian Games silver medalists for Vietnam
Southeast Asian Games medalists in football
Competitors at the 2009 Southeast Asian Games